Milwaukee, Minnesota is a 2003 American drama film starring Troy Garity, Alison Folland, Bruce Dern and Randy Quaid.

Plot
Mentally disabled champion fisher Albert Burroughs (Troy Garity) grows up under the protection of his possessive mother, Edna (Debra Monk), and gentle shopkeeper Sean (Bruce Dern). When Edna suddenly dies, word of Albert's inheritance and his winnings from fishing tournaments attracts unscrupulous types to his small Wisconsin town, including Jerry James (Randy Quaid), who claims to be the young man's father. Albert, who's smarter than he appears, must fend off everyone's designs on his money.

Cast
Troy Garity as Albert Burroughs
Alison Folland as Tuey Stites
Randy Quaid as Jerry James
Bruce Dern as Sean McNally
Hank Harris as Stan Stites
Debra Monk as Edna Burroughs
Josh Brolin as Gary
Holly Woodlawn as Transvestite

Reception
The film has a 38% approval rating based on 34 reviews on Rotten Tomatoes, with an average rating of 5.1/10. The website's critics consensus reads: "Well-cast but frustratingly underwhelming, Milwaukee, Minnesota assembles a number of intriguingly unique ingredients that add up to a mostly middling mess." Nick Schager of Slant Magazine awarded the film one star out of four. Nev Pierce of the BBC awarded it two stars out of five.

Accolades
Allan Mindel won the New American Cinema Award at the Seattle International Film Festival and the Young Critics Award for Best Feature at the Cannes Film Festival.

References

External links
 
 

2003 drama films
2003 films
American drama films
Films scored by Michael Convertino
2000s English-language films
2000s American films